Acarigua River is a river in Venezuela. It is part of the Orinoco River Delta.

See also
List of rivers of Venezuela

References
Rand McNally, The New International Atlas, 1993.

Rivers of Venezuela
Acarigua